Raju Mavani (1957 – 31 October 2019) was an Indian film director, producer, actor and screenplay writer. He had worked on many films and was known for his acting skills while playing a negative character.

Biography
Mavani was born in 1957. He was the producer of Balwaan which was released in 1992. This film was the debut film of Sunil Shetty. He also produced Imtihaan. He directed many films too. Apart from producing and directing he also acted in films like Sarkar, Wanted, Shootout at Wadala and Policegiri.

Death 
Raju Mavani died of cancer on 31 October 2019 in Mumbai at the age of 62.

Filmography

Producer, director and writer

Actor

References

External links

Hindi film producers
Male actors in Hindi cinema
2019 deaths
1957 births
Hindi-language film directors
Hindi screenwriters
Deaths from cancer in India